Thorvald Aagaard (8 June 1877 in Rolsted, Faaborg-Midtfyn – 22 March 1937 in Ringe) was a Danish composer, organist and college teacher.

He wrote the music to several continually popular songs, such as "" (The sparrow sits in silence behind a twig) and "" (I see the light beech islands). Alongside such composers as Carl Nielsen, Oluf Ring and Thomas Laub, he is considered one of the innovators of Danish popular music.

In memory of Aagaard, a statue was designed by Søren West and erected in Th.

Biographies 
 Ring, Frands Johann (1954). Thorvald Aagaard : Mennesket, Musikeren. Odense: Fyns Boghandels Forlag.  (in Danish)
 Balslev, Povl Chr. (2009). Thorvald Aagaard: komponist og musikformidler i den folkelige sangs tjeneste. Odense : Odense Bys Museer.  (in Danish)

External links

Article at the Odense Museum

1877 births
1937 deaths
People from Faaborg-Midtfyn Municipality
Danish classical composers
Danish male classical composers
Danish classical organists
Male classical organists
Pupils of Carl Nielsen